The USS Ammonoosuc (later renamed USS Iowa) was a steam frigate laid down by the Boston Navy Yard during the American Civil War and was launched, apparently without ceremony, on 21 July 1864. She was intended to be used against the British should England decide to take the side of the Confederate States of America and attack the Northern part of the United States. However, as the war progressed, England's support of the Confederacy diminished, and the fast and powerful Ammonoosuc was never placed into service.

Naval buildup against English threat 

From the outbreak of the Civil War, the Lincoln Administration seemed to feel that the British Government's sympathies lay with the Confederacy. The Trent Affair further strained Anglo-American relations, and the terrible toll exacted from Union shipping by commerce raiding Confederate cruisers built in England forced the Union Navy to make contingency plans for what appeared to be an increasingly likely war with England.

With the Royal Navy considerably more powerful than its American counterpart, the United States Navy decided that—should open hostilities with Queen Victoria's empire break out—it would adopt its traditional strategy of preying on British merchant shipping. To prepare for such an eventuality, the Federal Navy Department embarked upon a program of developing very fast seagoing steamships capable of overtaking all ships they might pursue and of escaping from any they might wish to elude.

Ammonoosuc’s novel design  

Ammonoosuc was one of these steamers. Her hull was designed by Benjamin Franklin Delano to hold a pair of extremely powerful engines to be built at New York City by the Morgan Iron Works according to plans drawn by Benjamin Franklin Isherwood for the screw frigate Wampanoag. These engines were not ready when Ammonoosuc was launched and the collapse of the Confederacy prompted a significant slowdown on the work as that all but eliminated the Navy's need for fast, new warships. The engines were finally finished late in 1867, and Ammonoosuc's hull was towed to New York City so that they might be installed.

Initial sea trials 

By late in the spring of 1868, the ship was finally ready to go to sea under her own power and departed New York City on 15 June for a run to Boston, Massachusetts at full speed. Dense fog over much of her course prevented her from proceeding at top velocity during most of the passage, but during one three-hour period she averaged 17.11 knots while moving from Cape Cod to Fort Warren, the highest sustained speed ever attained by a ship up to that time.

Nevertheless, since an unusually large proportion of the space within her hull was taken up by her powerful engines and related machinery, the ship was not commissioned. Instead, she was laid up in the Boston Navy Yard. While there, Ammonoosuc was renamed Iowa on 15 May 1869.

Final disposition 

She was sold at Boston on 27 September 1883 to the firm of Hubel and Porter, of Syracuse, New York.

See also

List of steam frigates of the United States Navy

References 

Ships of the Union Navy
Ships built in Boston
Sailing frigates of the United States Navy
Steamships of the United States Navy
1864 ships